The 2d Systems Operations Squadron, stationed at Offutt Air Force Base, Nebraska, delivers global environmental intelligence products and services for the defense of the United States of America and its global interests through the 24 × 7 operation, sustainment and maintenance of Air Force Weather's strategic center computer complex, production network, and applications.

Mission
The 2nd Systems Operations Squadron (2nd SYOS) delivers reliable and timely global environmental intelligence products and services for the defense of the United States of America and its global interests and operates and sustains the United States Air Force's $303M strategic weather high performance computing center to deliver authoritative environmental intelligence to decision makers across the spectrum of global operations.

The squadron operates the United States Air Force's largest Special Purpose Processing Node, the linchpin force enabler for the Air Force weather enterprise, generating thousands of critical environmental products and services to weather forecasters and operational end users every day, on a global scale. They maintain the Department of Defense's tactical weather location identifier program which ensures transmission of and access to vital weather information at deployed and oftentimes austere operating locations across the globe. Our professionals operate the 2nd Weather Group's Change Management program that oversees 205 software projects annually and maintains 126 software baselines to deliver cutting-edge capabilities across the spectrum of military operations. They apply over 20,000 system patches annually to mitigate security vulnerabilities across 78 production platforms, ensure data integrity across 90 databases, and enable DoD's sole space weather warning capability to secure our country's $104B strategic satellite fleet.

Organization
The 2nd SYOS is a 128-member squadron of military and civilian professionals, assigned to the 2nd Weather Group at Offutt Air Force Base, NE, that provides strategic-to operational-level specialized airpower by uniquely supporting the communication, computing, and programming needs of the highly-technical, data intensive Air Force Weather global enterprise. The squadron is composed of three flights: Operations, Software Sustainment and Change Management. Collectively, they form the core of the weather enterprise engine.

History
The 2nd SYOS was activated on 28 March 2007 as part of an Air Force Weather Agency restructure.

On 27 March 2015 the Air Force Weather Agency was re-designated as the 557th Weather Wing and was aligned under the United States Air Force's Air Combat Command, Twelfth Air Force. The purpose of the change is to ultimately refocus attention strictly to the weather forecasting mission and heritage that the agency prides itself in.

Lineage
 Constituted as the 2d Systems Operations Squadron on 17 January 2007
 Activated on 28 March 2007

Assignments
 Air Force Weather Agency, 28 March 2007 to 26 March 2015
 557th Weather Wing, 27 March 2015 to Present
 2d Weather Group, 28 March 2007 – present

Stations
 Offutt Air Force Base, Nebraska, 28 March 2007 – present

Commanders
 Lt Col C. Cantrell (28 Mar 2007 – 3 Aug 2009)
 Lt Col J. Shull (3 Aug 2009 – 22 Jul 2011)
 Lt Col M. Gauthier (22 Jul 2011 – 23 Jun 2014)
 Lt Col J. Blackerby (23 Jun 2014 – 26 Jun 2016)
 Lt Col J. McMillen (26 Jun 2016 – 30 Jun 2018)
 Lt Col R. DeLeon (30 Jun 2018 – 30 Jun 2020)
 Lt Col H. Schiano (30 Jun 2020 - 14 July 2022)
 Lt Col N. Gomez (14 July 2022 - Present)

Awards
 Air Force Outstanding Unit Award, 19 September 2007 – 31 December 2008
 2007 Lt Gen Harold W. Grant Award nominee from AFWA
 2008 Lt Gen Harold W. Grant Award nominee from AFWA
 2012 Lt Gen Harold W. Grant Award nominee from AFWA

References

 Notes

 Citations

External links
 557th Weather Wing Website
 557th Weather Wing Factsheets
 
 
 Air Force Weather Heritage: 1937 to 2012

Military units and formations in Nebraska
Systems Operations 002